Jørgen Erik Larsen (25 July 1945 – 7 February 2020) was a Danish football coach and player.

He spent most of his playing career at Herfølge Boldklub, playing 197 games for the club. In 1978, he was named sports director of Herfølge Boldklub and manager of the club in 1987. In 1993, he was named new coach of the Ghana national team, and later on he became the national team coach of Qatar. He was the manager of Qatari team Al-Rayyan SC, coaching Fernando Hierro, Mario Basler, and the brothers Frank and Ronald de Boer at the club. He was manager of Malaysian team Kedah FA, and attracted former Herfølge player Thomas Abel to the club in the summer of 2002. In November 2005, Larsen was signed as a manager of Brønshøj BK in the second-tier Danish 1st Division.

Honours 
 Qatari League: 1994–95

References

1945 births
2020 deaths
Danish men's footballers
Herfølge Boldklub players
Danish football managers
Herfølge Boldklub managers
Ghana national football team managers
Al-Rayyan SC managers
Qatar national football team managers
Sri Pahang FC managers
Brønshøj BK managers
Danish expatriate football managers
Expatriate football managers in Malaysia
Expatriate football managers in Ghana
Expatriate football managers in Qatar

Association footballers not categorized by position